Jerry Bohlander (born February 12, 1974) is an American former mixed martial artist. He is most notable for his UFC appearances and was a former UFC champion, winning the first lightweight (under 200 lb) tournament at UFC 12. He was a member of the legendary fight team the Lion's Den alongside other notable fighters such as Ken Shamrock, Guy Mezger, and Frank Shamrock. Bohlander was considered one of the best under 200 lb. fighters in the world during his time with the UFC.

Early life

Jerry Bohlander was first exposed to combat sports in the form of high school wrestling. Also, experimented in other affairs.  He was teammates with UFC fighter Pete Williams.

Mixed martial arts career

Jerry Bohlander began his MMA career on November 9, 1995 at United Full Contact Federation 2, where he defeated Phil Benedict by armbar.

With his victory at UFCF 2, Bohlander received an invitation to the open-weight UFC 8 tournament. However, he still had to fight against his teammate Pete Williams at the Lion's Den gym in order to see who would fight in the event. The match lasted twenty minutes before Bohlander submitted Williams to a heel hook.

At the event itself, Jerry won his quarter final fight against Scott Ferrozzo, who outweighed him by nearly 120 pounds. Jerry would then lose his semi-final bout to K1 and future Pride veteran Gary Goodridge via KO.

After losing his fight with Goodridge, Bohlander would go on a 5 fight win streak that would culminate in him winning the UFC 12 Lightweight tournament.

Following his victory at the UFC 12 Lightweight Tournament, Bohlander was knocked out by future UFC Middleweight Champion Murilo Bustamante

Bohlander would bounce back from this knockout loss by putting on arguably the finest performance of his career against Kevin Jackson. Kevin Jackson (an olympic gold medalist at the 1992 Barcelona games) was 3-1 at the time with his one loss being to UFC Light Heavyweight Champion Frank Shamrock. Jackson and Bohlander fought for ten minutes ending with Bohlander securing the armbar victory. The bout won Wrestling Observer Newsletter's "Fight of the Year" category for 1998.

Subsequent to his victory over Jackson, Bohlander was defeated by future UFC Light Heavyweight Champion, Tito Ortiz. Bohlander would go on to fight 3 more times in his career before retiring from the sport with a record of 11-4.

Personal life
On December 15. 2005 Jeremiah Bohlander less than one year with Napa Valley Sheriff's department shot and killed armed 39 year old Sam Rodriguez. The shooting was found justified.

On June 30, 2010, he was involved in the fatal shooting of 38-year-old Jose Luis Martinez Chavez, who was armed with a kitchen knife.

At the time of the shooting, Jeremiah Bohlander was a Napa County Sheriff's Deputy working with The Napa County Special Investigations Bureau (NSIB). Jeremiah Bohlander had been with NSIB six months. Napa County District Attorney Gary Lieberstein said that the shooting of Jose L. Martinez Chavez was justified.

Championships and Accomplishments
Icon Sport
SuperBrawl 1 Light Heavyweight Tournament Winner
Ultimate Fighting Championship
UFC 16 Middleweight Superfight Winner
UFC 12 Lightweight Tournament Winner
UFC 11 Tournament Semifinalist
UFC 8 Tournament Semifinalist
Wrestling Observer Newsletter
Fight of the Year (1998)  vs. Kevin Jackson on March 13

Mixed martial arts record

|-
| Win
| align=center| 11–4
| Kenny Kingsford
| Submission (armbar)
| Gladiator Challenge 24
| 
| align=center| 1
| align=center| 1:40
| Hopland, California, United States
| 
|-
| Loss
| align=center| 10–4
| Romie Aram
| Decision (unanimous)
| Gladiator Challenge 2
| 
| align=center| 3
| align=center| 5:00
| Colusa Rancheria, California, United States
| 
|-
| Win
| align=center| 10–3
| Brian Foster
| Submission (armbar)
| KOTC 5 - Cage Wars
| 
| align=center| 2
| align=center| 1:03
| San Jacinto, California, United States
| 
|-
| Loss
| align=center| 9–3
| Tito Ortiz
| TKO (cut)
| UFC 18
| 
| align=center| 1
| align=center| 14:31
| Kenner, Louisiana, United States
| 
|-
| Win
| align=center| 9–2
| Kevin Jackson
| Technical Submission (armbar)
| UFC 16
| 
| align=center| 1
| align=center| 10:23
| Kenner, Louisiana, United States
| 
|-
| Win
| align=center| 8–2
| John Renken
| Submission (armbar)
| World Pankration Championships 2
| 
| align=center| 1
| align=center| N/A
| Dallas, Texas, United States
| 
|-
| Loss
| align=center| 7–2
| Murilo Bustamante
| KO (upkick)
| Pentagon Combat
| 
| align=center| 1
| align=center| 5:38
| Brazil
| 
|-
| Win
| align=center| 7–1
| Nick Sanzo
| Submission (crucifix choke)
| rowspan=2|UFC 12
| rowspan=2|
| align=center| 1
| align=center| 0:39
| rowspan=2|Dothan, Alabama, United States
| 
|-
| Win
| align=center| 6–1
| Rainy Martinez
| Submission (rear-naked choke)
| align=center| 1
| align=center| 1:18
| 
|-
| Win
| align=center| 5–1
| Fabio Gurgel
| Decision (unanimous)
| UFC 11
| 
| align=center| 1
| align=center| 15:00
| Augusta, Georgia, United States
| 
|-
| Win
| align=center| 4–1
| Chris Charmos
| Submission (rear-naked choke)
| rowspan=2|Super Brawl 1
| rowspan=2|
| align=center| 1
| align=center| 8:27
| rowspan=2|Honolulu, Hawaii, United States
| 
|-
| Win
| align=center| 3–1
| Alan Schaible
| Submission (rear-naked choke)
| align=center| 1
| align=center| 2:10
| 
|-
| Loss
| align=center| 2–1
| Gary Goodridge
| KO (punches)
| rowspan=2|UFC 8
| rowspan=2|
| align=center| 1
| align=center| 5:31
| rowspan=2|San Juan, Puerto Rico
| 
|-
| Win
| align=center| 2–0
| Scott Ferrozzo
| Submission (guillotine choke)
| align=center| 1
| align=center| 9:03
| 
|-
| Win
| align=center| 1–0
| Phil Benedict
| Submission (armbar)
| United Full Contact Federation 2
| 
| align=center| 1
| align=center| 3:05
| N/A
|

References

External links
 
 

1974 births
Living people
People from Napa, California
American male mixed martial artists
Mixed martial artists from California
Light heavyweight mixed martial artists
Mixed martial artists utilizing wrestling
Mixed martial artists utilizing shootfighting
Ultimate Fighting Championship male fighters